Jalan Janda Baik (Pahang state route C7) is a major road in Pahang, Malaysia.

List of junctions

Roads in Pahang